Doolittle is a surname of English origin. Notable people with the surname include:

Amos Doolittle (1754–1832), American engraver and silversmith
Benjamin Doolittle (1825–1895), New York politician
Bev Doolittle (born 1947), American painter
Bill Doolittle (1923–2014), American football player and coach
Charles Doolittle (1832–1903), American Civil War general
Dorothy Doolittle (born 1946), American marathon runner
Ducky DooLittle (born 1970), American sex educator and performer
Dudley Doolittle (1881–1957), American congressman from Kansas
Eliakim Doolittle (1772–1850), American composer
Eliza Doolittle (singer) (born 1988), British singer
Emily Doolittle (born 1972), Canadian composer
Ford Doolittle (born 1941), American biochemist
Franklin M. Doolittle (1893–1979), American radio pioneer
Henry C. Doolittle (1850–1926), American judge
Hilda Doolittle (1886–1961), American poet and novelist
Isaac Doolittle (1721–1800), American clockmaker
James Rood Doolittle (1815–1897), American politician
Jane Doolittle (1899–1990), American missionary
Jimmy Doolittle (1896–1993), American aviation pioneer, general and recipient of the Medal of Honor
Joel Doolittle (1773–1841), American politician
John Doolittle (born 1950), American congressman from California
Justus Doolittle (1824–1880), American Board of Commissioners for Foreign Missions missionary to Fuhchau, China
Kristian Doolittle (born 1997), American basketball player for Hapoel Eilat of the Israeli Basketball Premier League
Lucius Doolittle (1800–1862), American priest
Lucy Salisbury Doolittle (1832-1908), American philanthropist
Melinda Doolittle (born 1977), American singer
Rilus Doolittle (1900–1983), American long-distance runner
Robyn Doolittle (born 1984), Canadian reporter
Russell Doolittle (born 1931), American biochemist
Sean Doolittle (born 1986), American baseball player
Sean Doolittle (author) (born 1971), American novelist
Thomas Doolittle (c. 1632–1707), English nonconformist minister, tutor, and author
Tilton E. Doolittle (1825–1896), politician and United States Attorney for the District of Connecticut 
William Doolittle

Fictional characters:
Doctor Dolittle, main character of a series of children's books by Hugh Lofting
Eliza Doolittle, main character of the play Pygmalion and its musical adaptation, My Fair Lady

References